The Seattle Sounders FC soccer team air their games in English & Spanish on local radio.  The English-language station is Sports Radio 950 KJR-AM while the 3-station Spanish-language network originates at KBRO and airs on the ESPN Deportes affiliates around the Pacific Northwest.  The ESPN Deportes network comprises 3 A.M. stations and 1 F.M. translator.  The Spanish network also includes a 30-minute pregame & 30-minute postgame analysis.

Radio Network (3 stations + 1 F.M. translator)
1280/KLDY: Lacey (2014-)
1480/KNTB: Lakewood (2014-)
1490/KBRO: Bremerton (2014-)
92.1/K221FJ: Tacoma (rebroadcasts KNTB)

Unsure status (2 stations)
1210/KMIA: Auburn-Federal Way
99.3/KDDS-FM: Elma, Washington

References

Radio Network
Sports radio networks in the United States